Ušivak is a village in the municipality of Hadžići, Bosnia and Herzegovina.

A temporary reception centre for migrants and refugees, located in Ušivak and run by the International Organisation for Migration, opened in October 2018.

Demographics 
According to the 2013 census, its population was 835.

References

Populated places in Hadžići